Point Blank is the third album by the hard rock band Bonfire. It was released in 1989 on the label BMG International.  During the recording sessions of this album, Hans Ziller was fired from the band, but the album features 10 songs written by him as well as 3 that feature him playing. Freddy Curci from Alias, Sheriff and Zion also contributed to additional backing vocals for this album. Originally, the band had recorded 30 songs and settled on 17 tracks for the album.

It entered the UK album charts on 21 October 1989, and reached number 74; it was only in the chart for 1 week.

Track listing

Remastered Edition
In 2009 Point Blank was remastered by Toni Ubler for the company Yesterrock.  This edition of the album now featured 7 additional songs, all live performances by Bonfire from circa 1989 when the album was originally released.  The track listing is as follows:

Band members
Claus Lessmann - lead & backing vocals, acoustic guitar
Angel Schleifer - guitar, backing vocals
Joerg Deisinger - bass, backing vocals, mouth drums
Edgar Patrik - drums, percussion, backing vocals

Additional musicians
 Hans Ziller - 2nd guitar solo on #01, acoustic slide guitar on #04, lead guitar on #05
 Fred Curci - additional backing vocals

Covers
In 1991, Desmond Child covered the song "The Price of Loving You" for his Discipline album.

References

 Billboard's Listing of Point Blank Album

Bonfire (band) albums
1989 albums